The Jo Stafford Show is a nine-episode British television programme which aired in the United Kingdom on a fortnightly basis starting 9 September 1961. It was presented by the American singer Jo Stafford, who was joined on stage by guests from the world of music and television; each episode was based on a particular theme. The show was broadcast in the United Kingdom, and was also aired internationally.

Overview
The Jo Stafford Show was produced as a series of one-hour specials. Stafford and her husband, Paul Weston, spent the summer of 1961 in London in order to record the show, and the series was produced by ATV at the ATV Elstree Studios in Hertfordshire. The programme featured Stafford and guests from the world of music and television in both the United Kingdom and United States, with each episode having a different theme, such as love or travel. The first episode featured the singer Ella Fitzgerald and the actress Claire Bloom in a show whose theme was love. Stafford and Fitzgerald performed a musical medley while Bloom recited poetry. This edition also featured a sketch with Kathleen Harrison and George Benson. The travel edition featured Kenneth More and the vintage motor car from the film Genevieve.

The website Television Heaven cites a different edition as the series' opening episode, this one centered on the theme of the differences between British and American English. Guests included Graham Stark and Peter Sellers. At Stafford's personal request she was accompanied on stage for the series by the British vocal group, The Polka Dots.

Although the series was produced in the United Kingdom, it was intended for international distribution. The website Cherished Television has called The Jo Stafford Show "the first truly international television musical series". Television Heaven says the show was "billed as the most ambitious series ever launched by a British television production company".

Episode list

The Classic TV Archive mentions an edition of The Jo Stafford Show recorded in London in 1959, suggesting it may have been a pilot for the later series. It is also unclear whether the episode was aired as part of the series when it aired in the United States. A list of episodes is shown below. Note that not all airdates are available.

References

External links

1961 British television series debuts
1961 British television series endings
1960s British television series
British variety television shows
Black-and-white British television shows
English-language television shows
Jo Stafford
Television shows shot at ATV Elstree Studios